Sumuri or Sumeri (one of two Papuan languages also known as Tanah Merah) is a language spoken in Sumuri District, Teluk Bintuni Regency on the Bomberai Peninsula by about a thousand people.

Distribution
In Sumuri District of Teluk Bintuni Regency, Sumuri people reside in Tofoi (district capital), Materabu Jaya, Forada, Agoda, Saengga, Tanah Merah Baru, Onar Lama, and Onar Baru villages.

Classification
In the classifications of Malcolm Ross (2005) and Timothy Usher (2020), Sumeri forms an independent branch of the Trans–New Guinea family, but Palmer (2018) classifies it as a language isolate.
It does not fit in with any of the established branches of TNG, but based on what little data there is, it would seem to be closest to either the Berau Gulf branches (i.e. South Bird's Head, West Bomberai etc.) or the Asmat–Mombum languages and their relatives further east.

Sumeri has previously been linked to the Mairasi languages, but those do not share the TNG pronouns of Sumeri. The Sumeri pronouns are:

{|class=wikitable
! !!sg!!pl
|-
!1ex
|rowspan=2|na-fea||kiria
|-
!1in
|kigokomaka
|-
!2
|ka-fea||ki-fia
|}

There are no 3rd-person personal pronouns, only demonstratives.  The pronouns appear to reflect pTNG *na 1sg, *ga 2sg, and *gi 2pl.

Vocabulary
The following basic vocabulary words are from Voorhoeve (1975), as cited in the Trans-New Guinea database:

{| class="wikitable sortable"
! gloss !! Tanah Merah
|-
| head || breŋka; kidaso
|-
| hair || nisa; nua
|-
| eye || ka-bita; ndou
|-
| tooth || eti; kioni
|-
| leg || kiwi; oto
|-
| louse || ia; miŋ
|-
| dog || ibe; yoku
|-
| pig || opo; tayna
|-
| bird || awə; finanaburu
|-
| egg || doŋ; no
|-
| blood || kinatera; sa
|-
| bone || naso; oro
|-
| skin || ele; katane
|-
| tree || o; ono; taya
|-
| man || do; maopa
|-
| sun || soniŋ; weti
|-
| water || bu; moda
|-
| fire || avonabe; siŋ
|-
| stone || kenade; oru
|-
| name || nigia; wado
|-
| eat || anine; taue
|-
| one || besika; naduma
|-
| two || bi; wanitabo
|}

See also
Mairasi languages

References

Notes

Trans–New Guinea languages
Languages of western New Guinea
Language isolates of New Guinea